The money-back policy from Life Insurance Corporation in India is a popular insurance policy. It provides life coverage during the term of the policy and the maturity benefits are paid in installments by way of survival benefits in every 5 years. The plan is available with 20 years and 25 years term. In the event of death within the policy term, the death claim is made up of full sum assured without deducting any of the survival benefit amounts already paid. The bonus is also calculated on the full sum assured. The premium paid is tax-deductible under section 80C of Income Tax Act 1961.

References

Life insurance in India